Tenami (てなみ) was an independent Japanese video game maker who was in business between 1998 and 2004. Their most successful game was Ikku Machi, but the only game translated into English was Garden Keeper.

Founded by Ito Shizura in 1998, when she was unable to find a publisher for her original game Ikku Machi (named after its protagonist, a college girl who hunts demons) a Side-scrolling video game that sold 15,000 copies in Japan over the period 1998–2010. The founder worked alone on the games, producing the graphics, programming, and music herself. She ended this phase of her career when she married a citizen of the United Kingdom and moved there.

References

External links
 https://twitter.com/sheffieldshizu1  Founder's twitter blog

Defunct video game companies of Japan
Video game development companies
Video game publishers
Japanese companies established in 1998
Japanese companies disestablished in 2004